Civil Party may refer to:

Civil Party (Costa Rica) (1893—1915)
Civil Party (Taiwan), minor political party in the Republic of China on Taiwan
Civilista Party, conservative former political party in Peru
Independent Civil Party, former political party in Peru

See also
Civic Party (disambiguation)